András Debreceni (born 21 April 1989) is a Hungarian footballer defender. He currently plays for Mosonmagyaróvári TE .

Debreceni made his debut for the senior side of his country on 1 June 2012 in the 2–1 win over the Czech Republic in a friendly match.

Honours

Hungary U-20 
 FIFA U-20 World Cup:
Third place: 2009

Budapest Honvéd FC 
 Hungarian Cup:
Winner: 2006–07, 2008–09
 Hungarian Super Cup:
Runners-up: 2007, 2009

Kecskeméti TE 
 Hungarian National Championship II:
Winner: 2007–08

Diósgyőri VTK 
Hungarian League Cup (1): 2013–14

References

External links 
 Profile at magyarfutball.hu
HLSZ
 Budapest Honvéd FC profile
Eto fc Győr profile

1989 births
Living people
People from Nagykanizsa
Hungarian footballers
Hungary youth international footballers
Hungary under-21 international footballers
Hungary international footballers
Association football defenders
Budapest Honvéd FC players
Kecskeméti TE players
Budapest Honvéd FC II players
Diósgyőri VTK players
Vasas SC players
Győri ETO FC players
Nemzeti Bajnokság I players
Nemzeti Bajnokság II players
Sportspeople from Zala County